Samoan Plantation Pidgin is an English-based pidgin language that was spoken by plantation workers in Samoa. It is closely related to Tok Pisin, due to the large number of New Guinean laborers in Samoa.

External links

English-based pidgins and creoles
Languages of Samoa